Anton Smirnov may refer to:

Anton Smirnov (footballer), born 1983), Russian footballer
Anton Smirnov (chess player) (born 2001), Australian chess player
Anton Smirnov (figure skater) (born 1982), Russian figure skater

See also
 Smirnov (surname)
 Smirnoff (surname)